Thomas or Tom Stafford may refer to:

Thomas P. Stafford (born 1930), American astronaut and Air Force general, orbited Moon on Apollo 10
Thomas Stafford, 3rd Earl of Stafford (died 1392)
Thomas Stafford (MP) (c. 1574–1655), illegitimate son of George Carew, 1st Earl of Totnes and MP for Weymouth and Melcombe Regis, Helston and Bodmin
Thomas Stafford (died 1425), MP for Warwickshire
Thomas Stafford (rebel) (1533–1557), son of Henry Stafford, 1st Baron Stafford, who was executed for high treason
Tom Stafford (astronomer), astronomer who has discovered a number of asteroids since 1997
Tom Stafford, author of Mind Hacks

See also

 Stafford (surname)
 
 
 Thomas (disambiguation)
 Stafford (disambiguation)